The Formate-Nitrite Transporter (FNT) Family belongs to the Major Intrinsic Protein (MIP) Superfamily. FNT family members have been sequenced from Gram-negative and Gram-positive bacteria, archaea, yeast, plants and lower eukaryotes. The prokaryotic proteins of the FNT family probably function in the transport of the structurally related compounds, formate and nitrite.

Structure 
With the exception of the yeast protein (627 amino acyl residues), all characterized members of the family are of 256-285 residues in length and exhibit 6-8 putative transmembrane α-helical spanners (TMSs). In one case, that of the E. coli FocA (TC# 1.A.16.1.1) protein, a 6 TMS topology has been established. The yeast protein has a similar apparent topology but has a large C-terminal hydrophilic extension of about 400 residues.

FocA of E. coli is a symmetric pentamer, with each subunit consisting of six TMSs.

Phylogeny 
The phylogenetic tree shows clustering according to function and organismal phylogeny. The putative formate efflux transporters (FocA; TC#s 1.A.16.1.1 and 1.A.16.1.3) of bacteria associated with pyruvate-formate lyase (pfl) comprise cluster I; the putative formate uptake permeases (FdhC; TC#s 1.A.16.2.1 and 1.A.16.2.3) of bacteria and archaea associated with formate dehydrogenase comprise cluster II; the nitrite uptake permeases (NirC, TC#s 1.A.16.2.5, 1.A.16.3.1, and 1.A.16.3.4) of bacteria comprise cluster III, and a yeast protein comprises cluster IV.

Function 
The energy coupling mechanisms for proteins of the FNT family have not been extensively characterized. HCO and NO uptakes may be coupled to H+ symport. HCO efflux may be driven by the membrane potential by a uniport mechanism or by H+ antiport. FocA of E. coli catalyzes bidirectional formate transport and may function by a channel-type mechanism.

FocA, transports short-chain acids. FocA may be able to switch its mode of operation from a passive export channel at high external pH to a secondary active formate/H+ importer at low pH. The crystal structure of Salmonella typhimurium FocA at pH 4.0 shows that this switch involves a major rearrangement of the amino termini of individual protomers in the pentameric channel. The amino-terminal helices open or block transport in a concerted, cooperative action that indicates how FocA is gated in a pH-dependent way. Electrophysiological studies show that the protein acts as a specific formate channel at pH 7.0 and that it closes upon a shift of pH to 5.1.

Transport Reaction 
The probable transport reactions catalyzed by different members of the FNT family are:

(1) RCO or NO (out) ⇌ RCO or NO (in),

(2) HCO (in) ⇌ HCO (out),

(3) HS− (out) ⇌ HS− (in).

Members 
A representative list of the currently classified members belonging to the FNT family can be found in the Transporter Classification Database. Some characterized members include:

FocA and FocB (TC#s 1.A.16.1.1 and 1.A.16.1.2, respectively), from Escherichia coli, transporters involved in the bidirectional transport of formate. 
FdhC, from Methanobacterium maripaludis (TC# 1.A.16.2.3) and Methanothermobacter thermoformicicum (TC# 1.A.16.2.1), a probable formate transporter. 
NirC, from E. coli (TC# 1.A.16.3.1), a probable nitrite transporter. 
Nar1 (TC# 1.A.16.2.4) of Chlamydomonas reinhardtii (Chlamydomonas smithii), a nitrite uptake porter of 355 amino acyl residues. 
B. subtilis hypothetical protein YwcJ (ipa-48R) (TC# 1.A.16.3.2).

References 

Protein families
Membrane proteins
Transmembrane proteins
Transmembrane transporters
Transport proteins
Integral membrane proteins